= Healthy food =

Healthy food describes food that is believed to contribute to personal or public health, and may refer to:

- a healthy diet
- food safety
- a particular health food
